Kyocera Kona is a line of low cost cellular phones manufactured by Kyocera Communications, Inc. It was one of a range of low cost and contract free phones available in the US during 2013. Kyocera Kona flip phones use NetFront web browser.  It's also available on Sprint's network with a two year contract.

References

Kona